Moist Music is a New York City based electronic dance music record label that is a subsidiary of Phase One Communications.  Victor Ortiz, aka Vicious Vic established Moist Music in 2004. Victor was previously part of the founding crew members of the early Caffeine movement in New York City, alongside his early production partner DJ Micro from the duo Progression.   Moist Music produces independent CDs and albums in major retail, as well as simultaneous digital releases for all new albums. Beginning in fall 2007, Moist began to release all albums through the back catalog digitally. An incomplete list of artists is provided below.

Artists and former artists 
 John 00 Fleming
 Marco V
 DJ Irene
 Reid Speed
 Johan Gielen
 Donald Glaude
 Markus Schulz
 D:Fuse
 DJ Micro
 George Acosta
 Meat Katie
 Stonebridge
 Filo & Peri
 Freaky Flow
 DJ Icey
 DJ Baby Anne
 Aphrodite
 AK1200
 Dave Seaman

See also
 List of record labels

External links
http://www.moistmusic.com/ (Macromedia Flash required)

American record labels
Record labels established in 2004
Electronic dance music record labels
Electronic music record labels
Companies based in New York City